Asko is a male given name common in Finland and Estonia. The nameday is 6 September. The first Asko was baptised in 1901, and as of 2009 there were more than 8000 people with this name in Finland.

Notable people with the name include:

 Asko Esna (born 1986), Estonian volleyball player
 Asko Jussila (born 1963), Finnish football manager
 Asko Kase (born 1979), Estonian film director
 Asko Künnap (born 1971), Estonian poet, artist, graphic designer and marketer
 Asko Paade (born 1984), Estonian basketball player 
 Asko Parpola (born 1941), Finnish Indologist and Sindhologist
 Asko Peltoniemi (born 1963), Finnish pole vaulter
 Asko Sahlberg (born 1964), Finnish novelist
 Asko Sarkola (born 1945), Finnish actor and theatre manager

References 

Finnish masculine given names
Estonian masculine given names